Liu Qing (born 5 April 1986 in Qingdao) is a Chinese footballer currently playing for Qingdao Huanghai as a defender in the China League One.

Club career

Qingdao Jonoon

Liu Qing was at Shandong Luneng from 1997 to 2006 where he rose through and eventually graduated from their  various youth teams. He was however unable to break into the senior team and did not make any senior appearances for them so Liu Qing would transfer to another Shandong team when he moved to Qingdao Jonoon in the beginning of the 2007 Chinese Super League season. He would make his debut against Hangzhou Greentown F.C. in Qingdao's first league game of the season on the 3rd of March, 2007 in a 1-1 draw. With them he would eventually play in 19 league games for them throughout the season and would participate in this team up to 2008.

Guizhou Renhe
Liu Qing transferred to top tier club Shaanxi Chanba at the beginning of the 2009 Chinese Super League season, however he would have to wait until July 14, 2010 before he made his debut in a league game against Shanghai Shenhua in a 2-1 victory. He would be a peripheral player for the next several seasons and at the beginning of the 2012 Chinese Super League season he would be part of the team which decided to move to Guizhou and renamed themselves Guizhou Renhe.

References

External links
Player stats at sports.sohu.com
 

1986 births
Living people
Chinese footballers
Footballers from Qingdao
Shandong Taishan F.C. players
Qingdao Hainiu F.C. (1990) players
Beijing Renhe F.C. players
Qingdao F.C. players
Chinese Super League players
China League One players
Association football defenders
21st-century Chinese people